Ashti is a city in Beed subdivision of Beed district in the Indian state of Maharashtra. Ashti (constituency number 231) is one of the six Vidhan Sabha constituencies located in Beed district. It covers the entire Ashti and Patoda tehsils and part of the Shirur tehsil of this district.

Administration 
One of the prominent leaders - Shri Bhimsenji Dhonde is from this constituency. He has been a visionary leader and has established Ashti as a forerunner in the field of education, agriculture and socio-economic justice.

History 
The town of Ashti came to prominence around the 16th century when it was awarded to the Dhonde dynasty as a "jagir". The Dhondes were one of the fiercest warriors and equally well educated and known for their benevolent rule. Under the Dhonde dynasty, the barren and rocky land of Ashti was converted to a more fertile place and a trade center that it is today. There is an interesting story behind this.

Dhondes fought for the Maratha Empire and brought glory and victory to the King, were given a reward - Ashti. It was a completely barren rocky land where life was scarce and survival was considered impossible. As a result of multiple centuries of toiling and creating so much out of nothing, today Ashti stands as one of the most important constituencies of Maharashtra.

External link 
Bhimrao Anandrao Dhonde at India leader

References
2."Delimitation of Parliamentary and Assembly Constituencies Order, 2008"

3. https://myneta.info/maharashtra2014/candidate.php?candidate_id=1181

4. https://www.collinsdictionary.com/dictionary/english/jagir

Cities and towns in Beed district
Talukas in Maharashtra
Talukas in Beed district